is a passenger railway station in the city of Midori, Gunma, Japan, operated by the third sector railway company Watarase Keikoku Railway.

Lines

Station layout
The station consists of a single side platform serving traffic in both directions. The station is unattended.

Adjacent stations

History
Kamikambai Station opened on 31 December 1912 as a station on the Ashio Railway.  The station building and platform were registered by the national government as a national Tangible Cultural Property in 2008.

Surrounding area
 Midori city Kambai Elementary School
 Kifune Jinja

See also
 List of railway stations in Japan

References

External links
 
  Station information (Watarase Keikoku) 

Railway stations in Gunma Prefecture
Railway stations in Japan opened in 1912
Midori, Gunma
Registered Tangible Cultural Properties